Elections were held in Washington state in 2006 for seats in the United States House of Representatives. Of the nine congressional districts, six were won by Democrats and three by Republicans, with the Democrats taking 64% of the vote.

Overview

District 1

Incumbent Democratic Congressman Jay Inslee easily dispatched Republican challenger Larry Ishmael to win a sixth term.

District 2

Democratic incumbent Congressman Rick Larsen defeated his Republican opponent, U.S. Navy veteran Doug Roulstone by a solid margin.

District 3

In a slight improvement over his 2004 performance, incumbent Democratic Congressman Brian Baird easily won a fifth term over Republican challenger Michael Messmore.

District 4

In his bid for a seventh term, Republican incumbent Congressman Doc Hastings beat back a spirited challenge from Democratic nominee Richard Wright. Though Hastings eventually beat Wright by a fairly solid margin, it was not the kind of landslide that Hastings usually experienced in this strongly conservative district based in Central Washington.

District 5

Like neighboring Congressman Hastings, incumbent Republican Congresswoman Cathy McMorris Rodgers faced a surprisingly strong challenge from Democratic nominee Peter J. Goldmark in her conservative, Eastern Washington district. Though Rodgers ultimately edged Goldmark out by a comfortable margin, the race got close enough for CQ Politics to change its rating on the race to Republican Favored from Safe Republican.

District 6

Long-serving Democratic incumbent Norm Dicks, a high-ranking member on the Appropriations Committee did not face a credible challenge to his bid for a sixteenth term from conservative activist Doug Cloud in this liberal, Kitsap Peninsula-based district.

District 7

In his bid for a ninth term, incumbent Democratic Congressman Jim McDermott easily beat out Republican nominee Steve Beren and independent Linnea S. Noreen in this very liberal, Seattle-based district.

District 8

In 2004, then-King County Sheriff Dave Reichert won his first campaign for the United States House of Representatives by a five-point margin. 2006 proved to be just as tough of a year for Reichert. Facing former Microsoft executive Darcy Burner for the first time, Reichert faced a grueling battle for re-election. Polls taken in October showed the two candidates to be about even and the two major newspapers in the area--the Seattle Post-Intelligencer and the Seattle Times--split their endorsements: The Post-Intelligencer endorsed Burner while the Times supported Reichert. Ultimately, though, a few weeks after election day, it became evident that Reichert had beaten out Burner and had won a second term.

District 9

Incumbent Democratic Congressman Adam Smith easily beat out Republican candidate Steven Cofchin for a sixth term in this Western Washington district based in the Puget Sound.

References

2006 Washington (state) elections
Washington

2006